Tell It to the Marines is a 1918 American silent comedy-drama film directed by Arvid E. Gillstrom and starring Jane and Katherine Lee, Charles Slattery, and Edward Bagley. The film was released by Fox Film Corporation on October 13, 1918.

Plot

Cast
Jane Lee as Jane Williams
Katherine Lee as Katherine Williams
Charles Slattery as Harry Williams
Edward Bagley as the Butler

Preservation
The film is now considered lost.

References

External links

1918 comedy-drama films
1910s English-language films
1918 films
American silent feature films
American black-and-white films
Fox Film films
Lost American films
1918 lost films
Lost comedy-drama films
1910s American films
Silent American comedy-drama films